Andy King (23 July 1942 – 23 February 2015) was a Scottish professional footballer who played for Kilmarnock, as a defender.

See also
List of one-club men in association football

References

1942 births
2015 deaths
Scottish footballers
Kilmarnock F.C. players
Scottish Football League players
Association football defenders
Scotland under-23 international footballers
Scottish Football League representative players